The 1952 Lady Wigram Trophy was a motor race held at the Wigram Airfield Circuit on 23 February 1952. It was the second Lady Wigram Trophy to be held and was won by Les Moore in the Alfa Romeo Tipo B for the second time in succession.

Classification

References

Lady Wigram Trophy
Lady
February 1952 sports events in New Zealand